The Bath House is a Category B listed building in Peterhead, Aberdeenshire, Scotland. Located at 7 Bath Street, it dates to around 1812.

Its description by architectural historian Charles McKean: a smart villa in smooth granite, has string-courses, quoins, a dentilled cornice, and a flight of steps up to a raised front door.

See also
List of listed buildings in Peterhead, Aberdeenshire

References

Category B listed buildings in Aberdeenshire
Listed buildings in Peterhead